Frédéric Schaub (born 30 April 1987) is a Swiss football defender currently without a club.

Schaub rose to public relevance due to his very low Fifa 10 rating of 38, making him the second lowest rated player in the game (and in the whole Fifa series), second only to Ian Baraclough (who has 36 in his base card and 25 in his special card).

External links 
 Swiss Football League profile  (doesn't work)
 FC Aarau profile 
 Fifa 10 card

1987 births
Living people
Swiss men's footballers
Association football defenders
FC Aarau players
FC Wohlen players